Specialized computer hardware is often used to execute artificial intelligence (AI) programs faster, and with less energy, such as Lisp machines, neuromorphic engineering, event cameras, and physical neural networks.

Lisp machines 

Lisp machines were developed in the late 1970s and early 1980s to make AI programs written in the programming language Lisp run faster.

Neural network hardware

Physical neural networks

Dataflow architecture

Dataflow architecture processors used for AI serve various purposes, with varied implementations like the polymorphic dataflow Convolution Engine by Kinara (formerly Deep Vision), structure-driven dataflow by Hailo, and dataflow scheduling by Cerebras.

Component hardware

AI accelerators

Since the 2010s, advances in computer hardware have led to more efficient methods for training deep neural networks that contain many layers of non-linear hidden units and a very large output layer. By 2019, graphics processing units (GPUs), often with AI-specific enhancements, had displaced central processing unit (CPUs) as the dominant means to train large-scale commercial cloud AI. OpenAI estimated the hardware compute used in the largest deep learning projects from AlexNet (2012) to AlphaZero (2017), and found a 300,000-fold increase in the amount of compute needed, with a doubling-time trend of 3.4 months.

Sources 

Computer hardware
Artificial intelligence